The 34th Light Infantry Division, also known as Special Security Division (SSD), is a 2-star Pakistan Army formation, raised in September 2016 as a response to major concerns over how to protect the China-Pakistan Economic Corridor (CPEC) and its workforce from serious internal and external threats.

SSD has also bore the brunt of attacks by Baloch and Sindhi separatists.

Organization 
34th Light Infantry Division (SSD) consists of 15,000 personnel organised into nine army infantry battalions and six paramilitary wings (from the Pakistan Rangers and the Frontier Corps), the latter funded by the Interior Ministry.

The SSD is the land-based counterpart to CPEC's maritime security command, Task-Force 88, raised in December 2016, and led by the Pakistan Navy, including personnel from the Pakistan Marines and the Maritime Security Agency.

Commanders 
In 2016, SSD was formed and stationed at Chilas. Later it was renamed as 34th Light Infantry Division. And finally it is renamed into Special Security Division (SSD).

First GOC was appointed in September 2016.
 Maj Gen Abid Rafique (September 2016 - April 2017)
 Maj Gen Ahsan Gulrez (April 2017 - October 2018)
 Maj Gen Ghulam Jafar (October 2018 - February 2020)
 Maj Gen Kamran Nazir Malik (December 2020 - to date)

See also 
 X Corps (Pakistan)
 XI Corps (Pakistan)
 China–Pakistan relations

References

External links 
 Developments in CPEC Project and evolving issues and threats
 Pakistan: What Stands in CPEC’s Way?

Divisions of the Pakistan Army
Military special forces of Pakistan
China–Pakistan Economic Corridor